Major General Carroll W. McColpin (November 15, 1914 – November 28, 2003) was a United States Air Force officer who served during World War II and the Cold War. Prior to the United States entry into World War II, in November 1940, he volunteered for duty with the Royal Air Force (RAF) in November 1940 and was commissioned a pilot officer in the RAF before transferring to the United States Army Air Forces in the grade of major in September 1942.

His decorations include the Air Force Distinguished Service Medal, Legion of Merit with two oak leaf clusters, Air Medal with six oak leaf clusters and the British Distinguished Flying Cross. McColpin was credited with 12 kills, 5 probable, and 12 damaged while with the Eagle Squadrons. In both services he could have claimed a minimum of ten more Luftwaffe aircraft of mixed types destroyed on the ground by attacking German airfields in France and Germany. McColpin scored another 8 confirmed kills while in the Army Air Force.

Early years
Carroll Warren McColpin was born in Buffalo, New York on November 15, 1914, and was raised and educated in Los Angeles, California. He participated in civilian flying activities in Los Angeles, and in 1936 obtained his pilot's certificate. As a young man, he had built his own airplane and taught himself the basics of stick flying and aerial acrobatics by the age of sixteen.

RAF service
Despite official United States government disapproval, McColpin travelled via Canada to England where he joined the Royal Air Force (RAF) in November 1940.

After serving initially with the RAF's No. 607 Squadron in May 1941, McColpin joined the second Eagle Squadron, No. 121 Squadron, as a pilot and then went to No. 71 Squadron, the 1st Eagle Squadron. In November 1941 he was awarded the Distinguished Flying Cross. The award was made personally by King George VI. In January 1942 he was posted as a flight commander in No. 133 Squadron. McColpin went back to the United States in June 1942 to participate for 10 weeks in a War Bond tour followed by 4 weeks home leave. On his return, being an American, a flying ace and having served in combat with all three Eagle Squadrons, McColpin was appointed to command 133 Squadron.

McColpin was the only American to fly combat in all three RAF American Eagle Squadrons. He flew a total of over 300 missions in these squadrons, counting the ones he flew with No. 607 Squadron. He was a double ace before Pearl Harbor and was the first American to be decorated, in Buckingham Palace, by King George VI during World War II.

USAAF service
On the United States entry into the war, and the arrival of the United States' Eighth Air Force in Britain, the US Eagle Squadron personnel and equipment transferred to the United States Army Air Forces in September 1942 and McColpin was appointed to the rank of major and the command of the 336th Fighter Squadron, 4th Fighter Group. Returning to the United States in 1943, he was assigned duty as assistant deputy for operations, III Fighter Command, Drew Field, Florida, and he subsequently assumed command of the 407th Fighter Bomber Group at Lakeland Field, Florida. in September of that year.

In January 1944, McColpin was appointed commander of the 404th Fighter Bomber Group at Myrtle Beach Field, South Carolina, and moved that unit overseas to England where he remained in command through the English, French and Belgian campaigns.

In December 1944, McColpin transferred to the XXIX Tactical Air Command as director of combat operations. He returned to the United States in March 1945 and served as deputy and later as commander of the III Fighter Command Gunnery School at Pinellas Field, Florida until February 1946, when he proceeded to Germany to command the 365th Fighter Group at AAF Station Schweinfurt.

USAF career
McColpin returned to the United States from Germany in October 1947, to command the 31st Fighter Group at Turner AFB, Albany, Georgia, until February 1950, when he entered the Armed Forces Staff College as a student. Upon his graduation in July 1950, McColpin was assigned to the Continental Air Command at Mitchel AFB, New York, and later to the Air Defense Command, at Ent AFB, Colorado Springs, Colorado, as director of operations and training. In June 1952, he was transferred to Eastern Air Defense Force Headquarters at Stewart AFB, New York as the deputy for operations, where he remained until entry into the Air War College in July 1954.

After graduation from the Air War College in June 1955, McColpin assumed command of the 64th Air Division (Defense) at Pepperrell Air Force Base, St. Johns Newfoundland, Canada. He was transferred to Headquarters North American Air Defense Command, Colorado Springs, Colorado, on August 1, 1958, as director of operations and served in that capacity until July 1962.

McColpin commanded the San Francisco Air Defense Sector at Beale AFB, California, from August 1962 to June 1963, before his assignment as commander, Portland Air Defense Sector, Adair Air Force Station, Oregon. In October 1964, McColpin was named vice commander, 28th Air Division (SAGE), headquartered at Hamilton Air Force Base, California. He later became commander, Fourth Air Force at Hamilton on 1 April 1966. He retired on September 1, 1968.

References

External links
4th Fighter Group WWII Official WWII Association Website Referenced 4 March 2012
 USAF Biography Page
 Colonel Carroll W McColpin
 Carroll McColpin, American Eagle Ace
 Carroll McColpin

1914 births
2003 deaths
Military personnel from Buffalo, New York
United States Army Air Forces personnel of World War II
American Royal Air Force pilots of World War II
American World War II flying aces
United States Air Force generals
Recipients of the Distinguished Flying Cross (United States)
Recipients of the Legion of Merit
Burials at Arlington National Cemetery
United States Army Air Forces officers
Royal Air Force officers
Recipients of the Croix de guerre (Belgium)
Aviators from New York (state)
Recipients of the Air Medal
Recipients of the Distinguished Flying Cross (United Kingdom)
Recipients of the Croix de Guerre 1939–1945 (France)